Papley is a surname. Notable people with the surname include:

 Max Papley (born 1940), Australian footballer
 Tom Papley (born 1996), Australian footballer

See also
 Pawley